Bubanja is a Serbo-Croatian surname, derived from bubanj, meaning "drum". It may refer to:

Vladimir Bubanja (born 1989), Serbian footballer
Davor Bubanja (born 1987), Slovenian footballer

See also
 Bubanj, settlement

Serbian surnames